Calum Antell (born 13 June 1992) is a Welsh footballer who plays for Berwick Rangers as a goalkeeper.

Early and personal life
Antell was born in Abergavenny and raised in Ebbw Vale. He began playing local football, initially as a striker.

Club career
Antell joined Hibernian in June 2010 after previously playing for Swindon Town. He signed a new one-year contract with the club in July 2012. During his time with Hibernian he spent loan spells at  East Stirlingshire and East Fife. He was East Stirling's 'Player of the Year' for the 2011–12 season.

After leaving Hibernian in 2013, Antell played for Queen of the South, spending a loan spell at Brechin City during his time there. Antell was released by Queens in May 2014 and signed for Nairn County later that year. He left Nairn in July 2016, with his contract being cancelled by mutual consent.

Following his departure from Nairn, Antell signed for newly promoted Scottish League Two club Edinburgh City. After five years with Edinburgh, Antell moved to Arbroath in June 2021.

International career
Antell has represented Wales at under-19 youth level.

References

1992 births
Living people
Welsh footballers
Swindon Town F.C. players
Hibernian F.C. players
East Stirlingshire F.C. players
East Fife F.C. players
Queen of the South F.C. players
Brechin City F.C. players
Nairn County F.C. players
F.C. Edinburgh players
Scottish Football League players
Scottish Professional Football League players
Highland Football League players
Association football goalkeepers
Arbroath F.C. players
Berwick Rangers F.C. players